Pesci is an Italian surname. Notable people with the surname include:
 Adriana Pesci, Argentine mathematician and physicist
 Alessandro Pesci (born 1960), Italian film cinematographer
 Gerolamo Pesci (1679–1759), Italian painter
 Joe Pesci (born 1943), American actor
 Timothy Pesci (1944-2016), American politician

Italian-language surnames